Guy Adam Pratt (born 3 January 1962) is a British bassist. He has worked with artists including Pink Floyd (also David Gilmour and Nick Mason), Roxy Music (also Bryan Ferry), Gary Moore, Madonna, Peter Cetera, Michael Jackson, the Smiths, Robert Palmer, Echo & the Bunnymen, Tears for Fears, Icehouse, Bananarama, Iggy Pop, Tom Jones, Debbie Harry, Whitesnake, Womack & Womack, Kirsty MacColl, Coverdale•Page, Lemon Jelly, the Orb, All Saints, Stephen Duffy, Robbie Robertson, and A. R. Rahman. In addition to his work as a session musician, Pratt has been a member of the Australian rock band Icehouse, and is currently a member of the band Nick Mason's Saucerful of Secrets with Gary Kemp of Spandau Ballet.

Pratt has also been an actor and worked on TV and film soundtracks, including Dick Tracy (1990), Last Action Hero (1993), Hackers (1995), Still Crazy (1998) and Johnny English Reborn (2011). In 2005 he debuted a one-man music and comedy show.

Early life
Pratt was born on 3 January, 1962, in a flat above a shop on the Cut, London. His father, Mike Pratt, was an actor, songwriter and screenwriter who died when Guy was 14. Pratt worked for a while as a graphic designer, but decided to concentrate on a music career. In the late 1970s, Pratt was in a band based in Southend-on-Sea called Speedball, which released a single on NO PAP1 Records called 'No Survivors'. 

In 1981, aged 19, Pratt was asked to tour with Icehouse. Two years later as a member of Icehouse he supported David Bowie on his Serious Moonlight Tour, which was Bowie's longest, largest, and most successful concert tour. A support slot at a 1984 David Gilmour solo concert led to a stint with Pink Floyd. He also spent some time in Los Angeles where he played with Madonna and Michael Jackson.

Career
In 1986 the Smiths' bassist Andy Rourke was arrested on drug possession charges shortly before the band was scheduled to leave for its North American tour in support of The Queen Is Dead. Expecting that Rourke would thus be denied work visas for the U.S. and Canada, the band's guitarist, Johnny Marr, asked Pratt to step in. He spent nearly two weeks with Rourke and the band, learning bass lines and rehearsing, but shortly before the band was to leave Britain Rourke received his visas, and there was no need for Pratt to go.

Pratt came to prominence when he was chosen to play bass for Pink Floyd's post-Roger Waters A Momentary Lapse of Reason Tour in 1987–90, and The Division Bell Tour in 1994. He co-performed the lead vocals on "Run Like Hell", "Another Brick in the Wall, Part 2", "Us and Them" and "Comfortably Numb" with Gilmour during the live shows. He also played bass on several tracks on The Division Bell. Tony Levin had performed all of the bass parts on A Momentary Lapse of Reason; Pratt replaced him on the later tour owing to Levin's unavailability. Pratt also toured as part of Gilmour's On an Island Tour backing band, alongside another Pink Floyd member (and his father-in-law), Richard Wright. He also later performed with Gilmour during his Rattle That Lock World Tour in 2015–16.

Pratt played bass on Gary Moore's Dark Days in Paradise tour in 1997.

Besides working as a bass player, Pratt is a songwriter and composes music for TV and film. As a songwriter, Pratt co-wrote the UK number-one hit "Ain't No Doubt" by Jimmy Nail. He produced, co-wrote and played bass, guitar and keyboards on the music for the 1998 Channel 4 drama series The Young Person's Guide to Becoming a Rock Star. With regular collaborator Dom Beken, he provided the theme music to Spaced, where he also appeared as the character Minty. Pratt also acted in Linda Green and appeared in an episode of the remake of Randall & Hopkirk, starring Vic Reeves and Bob Mortimer. Pratt's father Mike had played the part of Jeff Randall in the original 1960s series. Pratt also played as a regular in the backing band for the BBC Radio 2 musical comedy show Jammin' with Rowland Rivron.

Pratt and Jimmy Cauty released a single "I Wanna 1-2-1 With You" as Solid Gold Chartbusters in 1999; Pratt and Cauty (a founder of the Orb) later teamed up with the other original member of the Orb, Alex Paterson, to form Transit Kings.

Pratt's one-man music and comedy show, My Bass & Other Animals, debuted in August 2005 at the Edinburgh Festival Fringe; this led to his book of the same name, published in May 2007. Pratt spent 2011 performing stand-up in Switzerland, Australia, and at the Edinburgh Fringe, as well as on a South American tour playing bass guitar for Dominic Miller.

In April 2010, Pratt joined the Argentine cover band the End Pink Floyd, with Durga McBroom and Jon Carin, in Buenos Aires, Argentina. Pratt joined the Australian Pink Floyd Show on stage on 13 June 2011 for the Hampton Court Palace Festival for the song "Run Like Hell". He joined the UK Pink Floyd cover band Brit Floyd on stage on 9 November 2013 as a special guest during the Liverpool leg of their Pulse tour. He performed on the songs "One of These Days", "Comfortably Numb" and shared lead vocals with the band's lead singer Damian Darlington during the finale of "Run Like Hell".

During the COVID-19 pandemic, he made a series of "Lockdown Licks" videos released on his YouTube channel, reminiscing about some of his best-known work.

Nick Mason's Saucerful of Secrets 
In 2018, Pratt and others formed a new band, Nick Mason's Saucerful of Secrets, to perform Pink Floyd's early psychedelic material. Along with Pratt, the band comprises Pink Floyd drummer Nick Mason, former Blockheads guitarist Lee Harris, vocalist and guitarist Gary Kemp of Spandau Ballet, and Pratt's collaborator keyboardist Dom Beken. The band toured Europe and North America in 2018 and 2019, with a third tour postponed to 2021 due to the COVID-19 pandemic. In September 2020, they released a live album and film, Live at the Roundhouse.

Equipment
Pratt's standard bass guitar arsenal includes a selection of various vintage Fender Precision and Jazz Basses, three Music Man StingRay 4-strings (black with rosewood fretboard and black pickguard, black with maple fretboard and white pickguard, natural with maple fretboard and black pickguard), a pair of headless Status 4 and 5-strings (fretless and fretted) and an amber Stuart Spector NS2.

During David Gilmour's On an Island Tour, he mainly used a 3-colour sunburst 1961 Fender Precision, a burgundy mist 1963 Fender Jazz named 'Betsy', a Status Vintage GP Signature and a Framus Triumph electric upright bass. On Gilmour's Live in Gdańsk DVD he is seen playing his Fender Jazz and Precision Basses as well as a Candy Apple Red Lakland Joe Osborn signature fretless Jazz Bass and a Rickenbacker 4001. On the studio jamming sessions included in the DVD, he played several Fender Jazz Basses, a Hofner Icon bass and a Ned Steinberger Design CR electric upright.

Pratt played his fretted 5-string and fretless 4-string Status headless basses, the amber Spector NS2, the burgundy mist "Betsy" 1963 Jazz Bass and two Precision Basses (a 2-colour sunburst 1958 and a "single-coil pickup" butterscotch blonde 1951) during the Pulse concerts in 1994.

Pratt was seen playing Aria SB series and fretless Steinberger L2/Xl headless basses during his stint in Icehouse.

Pratt has used Rickenbacker 4001V63 and a "Sunburst" 4003 Rickenbacker bass, when playing earlier (Barrett era) Pink Floyd songs, when performing at David Gilmour solo projects and Nick Mason's "Saucerful of Secrets" band.

His amps are usually Ashdown ABM heads and Ashdown ABM 810 Cabinets, although when playing with Gilmour they are WEM-badged to match Gilmour's cabinets.

Awards
He has been nominated for two Ivor Novello Awards and was awarded an ARIA Award for his work with Icehouse.

Writing
Pratt is the author of a book:
My Bass and Other Animals (2007), Orion

Personal life
Pratt married furniture designer Gala Wright, daughter of the Pink Floyd keyboardist Richard Wright, in 1996 in the Royal Borough of Kensington and Chelsea, London. The couple have a son. They later divorced.

In March 2019, Pratt became engaged to the children's author Georgia Byng. In the same year Pratt was announced as the general election candidate for the Renew Party in Brighton Kemptown.

Discography

1980s

1990s

2000s

2010s

2020s

Filmography

References

External links
Guy Pratt's official website

1962 births
20th-century English bass guitarists
21st-century English bass guitarists
20th-century multi-instrumentalists
21st-century multi-instrumentalists
English autobiographers
English rock bass guitarists
English rock musicians
English male comedians
English male singers
Male bass guitarists
English multi-instrumentalists
English session musicians
English rock singers
English songwriters
Living people
Musicians from London
People from Lambeth
People from Peckham
People educated at Kingham Hill School
Progressive rock musicians
Icehouse (band) members
The Gary Moore Band members
The Power Station (band) members